Vincent Coakley (1955 – 5 November 2020) was an Irish Gaelic footballer. At club level he played with Aghinagh, Millstreet and Muskerry and was a National League winner with the Cork senior football team.

Playing career

A member of the Aghinagh club, Coakley first came to prominence when he was drafted onto the Cork minor football team. He won a Munster Championship medal in this grade in 1973, before later having two unsuccessful years with the under-21 team. Coakley joined the Cork senior team during the 1976 Munster Championship and made his debut two years later in the Munster final against Kerry. He won a National League medal in 1980 in what was his last season with the team.

Honours

Cork
National Football League (1): 1979–80
Munster Minor Football Championship (1): 1973

References

1955 births
2020 deaths

Millstreet Gaelic footballers
Muskerry Gaelic footballers
Cork inter-county Gaelic footballers
Gaelic games players from County Cork